Komachi Monogatari (小町物がたり) is a Japanese otogi-zōshi in two volumes, composed late in the Muromachi period or the beginning of the early modern period.

Date, genre and sources 
Komachi Monogatari was composed some time between the end of the Muromachi period and the beginning of the Edo period.

It is a work of the otogi-zōshi genre. It is one of a large number of works, the so-called Komachi-mono (小町物), that draw on the legends surrounding the poet Ono no Komachi, a category that also includes Komachi Sōshi, Komachi Uta-arasoi, Kamiyo Komachi and Tamazukuri Monogatari. It specifically combines the dokuro-densetsu (髑髏伝説), legends about Komachi's skull being found in a grassy field, hyakuya-gayoi (百夜通い), legends that the courtier Fukakusa no Shōshō tried and tragically failed to visit her for one hundred nights, and sotoba-komachi. It is unique among the Komachi-mono for its setting in the Rendaino (蓮台野) and the appearance of the poet-monk Saigyō.

Takashi Fujii, in his article on the work for the Nihon Koten Bungaku Daijiten, identified the Noh play Sotoba Komachi as a source for the work.

References

Citations

Works cited 

 
 

Otogi-zōshi
Muromachi-period works
Ono no Komachi